Inland Baining Rural LLG is a local-level government (LLG) located in the Baining Mountains of East New Britain Province, Papua New Guinea.

Wards
01. Alakasam
02. Lamarain
03. Raunsepna (Qaqet speakers)
04. Yayami
05. Malasaet
06. Burit
07. Manapki
08. Liaga
09. Kereba
10. Vudal
11. Vunapalading No.1
12. Vunapalading No.2
13. Rangulit
14. Lamarainam
15. Mandressem Sett
16. Lulit
17. Radingi
18. Kamanakam (Qaqet speakers)
19. Ragaga
20. Rhungagi
22. Kadaulung No.2 (Taulil language speakers)
23. Vungi
24. Gaulim
25. Kainagunan
26. Ivere (Kairak language speakers)
27. Malabonga (Kairak language speakers)

References

Local-level governments of East New Britain Province